The final tournament of the 1934 FIFA World Cup was a single-elimination tournament involving the 16 teams which qualified for the tournament. The tournament began with the round of 16 on 27 May and concluded with the final on 10 June 1934. Italy won the final 2–1 for their first World Cup title.

All times are in Central European Time (UTC+01).

Bracket

Round of 16

Spain vs Brazil
Brazil – who had only kept Carvalho Leite from the squad participating in the previous edition of the World Cup – were outclassed by Spain in the first half, who scored thrice. In the second half, Spanish players played more complacently. Leônidas pulled one back for Brazil, then he scored again moments later, but the goal was disallowed for offside. Later, Ricardo Zamora saved a penalty from Waldemar de Brito.

Hungary vs Egypt
Hungary scored twice in 31 minutes. Rather than being disheartened, Egypt showed a positive attitude and leveled with two goals from Abdulrahman Fawzi. In the second half, Hungary played better and dictated the tempo, scoring two more goals and deserving to reach the quarter-finals.

Switzerland vs Netherlands
Netherlands were narrowly defeated by Switzerland. Switzerland took an early lead thanks to Leopold Kielholz finishing off a good piece of play from André Abegglen. Netherlands equalised with Kick Smit, who converted a free-kick by Puck van Heel. Kielholz restored the Swiss advantage before half-time with a long-range effort. After the interval, the lead was extended thanks to Abegglen's goal. Netherlands frequently threatened the Swiss goal, scoring one from a free-kick, but Switzerland held on for the victory.

Italy vs United States
A superior Italian team had a comfortable victory against the United States, which had played against Mexico in the qualifying just three days earlier. Schiavio scored two goals in the first half, one of which was from more than 30 yards out. A good performance from the US goalkeeper Julius Hjulian did not prevent Italy scoring seven goals before the final whistle.

Czechoslovakia vs Romania
Romania were the underdogs, yet they went ahead after just 11 minutes with a close range goal from Ștefan Dobay. After Silviu Bindea missed an opportunity to double Romania's advantage, Czechoslovakia scored twice and held on for the victory.

Sweden vs Argentina
Argentina proved a shadow of the team that was finalist in the 1930 World Cup. In fact, they presented a roster of newcomers as only Alfredo Devincenzi and Arcadio López were previously capped by the team. Argentina took the lead with a 25-yard free kick by Ernesto Belis. A more organised Sweden team soon equalized with Sven Jonasson. Argentina showed an excellent attacking prowess and went ahead again with an individual effort from Alberto Galateo. However, an efficient Sweden team took advantage of the defensive weakness of Argentina to score twice before the final whistle and hold on for the victory.

Austria vs France
France took the lead with a goal from Jean Nicolas, who had suffered a head injury in the early stages of the match. Austria drew level on the brink of half time thanks to a goal from the star Matthias Sindelar. An uneventful second half followed, so the match became the first in the history of World Cup to go to extra time. In the extra time, Austria prevailed and scored twice before France got a late second goal from the spot.

Germany vs Belgium
A clinical Germany took their chance to achieve a scoreline that did not reflect the balance of the game. Belgium closed the first half in the lead, however, Germany came out stronger from the dressing room and overturned the results. Edmund Conen scored a hat-trick.

Quarter-finals

Austria vs Hungary
An extremely tough game prevented the two teams from truly showing the technical skills they possessed. Austria took an early lead with Johann Horvath, who finished a well-organised team move. Austria doubled their lead in the early stages of the second half. Shortly after, Hungary got one back thanks to a penalty caused by Karl Sesta. The match hung in the balance until Hungary lost two players: Imre Markos was red carded and István Avar got injured. After that, Austria comfortably cruised to the victory.

Italy vs Spain
The first game between Italy and Spain was one of the most contentious and marred by several poor refereeing decisions, especially seeing Italy players challenging roughly the goalkeeper Ricardo Zamora. Spain went ahead with Luis Regueiro, but their lead did not last long. Italy equalized when Giovanni Ferrari knocked in a rebound, while Zamora was blocked off by Schiavio. The tie required a replay to settle.

Germany vs Sweden
Pouring rain influenced the match, which saw very few notable moments in the first half. In the second half, Ernst Andersson suffered a head injury, and Germany took the lead with Karl Hohmann while the Swedish player was off. Hohmann scored again three minutes later. Sweden managed to get a goal back, but their subsequent efforts were not enough and Germany progressed to the first of many semi-finals.

Czechoslovakia vs Switzerland
In a well-balanced game, Switzerland took the lead with Kielholz thanks to a counter-attacking play. Czechoslovakia equalized soon after with František Svoboda, who turned a chance created by Jiří Sobotka into a goal. In the second half, although Switzerland dominated the ball possession, it was Czechoslovakia scoring twice and holding on for the victory.

Replay: Italy vs Spain
The replay was played the day after the first game. The exhaustion and the injuries resulting from the first tie forced Italy and Spain to make four and seven changes respectively. Most notably, the experienced Zamora had to give way to the uncapped goalkeeper Juan José Nogués. Once again, the game was marred by controversial refereeing decisions. In the first five minutes, Crisant Bosch was hacked down by Eraldo Monzeglio in the penalty box. The penalty was not given, but the tackle resulted in the injury of Bosch. With no substitutes available, Spain had to play the remainder of the game with 10 men. Giuseppe Meazza scored soon after from a corner kick situation. In the second half, two Spanish goals were disallowed: one for offside and the other for a foul on a Spanish player. The referee, René Mercet, was suspended in the aftermath of the tournament.

Semi-finals

Italy vs Austria
A torrential downpour hampered the Austrians' passing game while benefiting the more varied Italian game. Italy took the lead when a ball broke free from the Austrian goalkeeper because of an intervention by Giuseppe Meazza. The ball then hit the post and was turned into goal by a perfectly positioned Enrique Guaita. In the second half, Austrian efforts to equalize were stopped by Gianpiero Combi, and Italy managed to hold on for the victory.

Czechoslovakia vs Germany
The game proved to be a clash of styles, with a more technical Czechoslovakia facing a  physical German side. Czechoslovakia took the lead in the first half, but Germany drew level in the second half when František Plánička could not keep out a tame shot by Rudolf Noack. The Germany goal stimulated the Czechoslovakian side.  Czechoslovakia took advantage of their finesse and attacking prowess to score twice with Oldřich Nejedlý, who completed a hat-trick.

Third place play-off
Both teams changed their usual line-ups, resting several players. Austrian players wore an unusual light blue jersey borrowed from Napoli because of the clash of colours between the two traditional jerseys. Germany took the lead inside 25 seconds with the fastest goal of the tournament, scored by Ernst Lehner. They doubled the lead with Edmund Conen, but Austria got one back immediately after with Johann Horvath. Germany's third goal came after Karl Sesta attempted to sit on the ball to ridicule a German player; the ball was stolen by Conen, who crossed to Lehner. Sesta then scored a goal, but Germany held on for the victory.

Final

References

External links
1934 FIFA World at FIFA.com
1934 FIFA World at RSSSF.com

Final tournament
1934
tournament
tournament
tournament
tournament
tournament
tournament
tournament
tournament
tournament
tournament
tournament
tournament
tournament
tournament
tournament
tournament